The Dál Messin Corb were a ruling dynasty of Leinster along with the Dál Chormaic. Descended from Chú Chorb's son Messin Corb, they were the last of the Dumnonians. In the fifth and sixth centuries they were ousted and driven from their seat on the Liffey and into Wicklow.

The main branch of the dynasty were the Uí Garrchon. The sixth-century saint, Kevin of Glendalough, was said to have been descended from the Uí Náir, a minor branch.

See also 
 Laigin
 Fortuatha

References 

 
5th-century Irish monarchs
Kings of Leinster
History of County Wicklow
History of County Kildare
Laigin
Gaelic-Irish nations and dynasties